The Brushy Fork Coal Impoundment, also known as the Brushy Fork Coal Sludge Dam, is a large tailings dam on the Brushy Fork near Marfork in western Raleigh County of West Virginia, United States. Brushy Fork flows into Little Marsh Fork, which then enters Marsh Fork, which is a tributary of the Coal River. The purpose of the dam is to store a sludge consisting of tailings and waste from a nearby coal mine. In 1995 Massey Energy received a permit to construct the dam. Over the years additional permits to increase the size and storage volume of the dam have been issued in the midst of local and regional opposition to its structural integrity. When complete its designed height will be . Wasted rock from the coal mining process is used as the dam filler. This capacity will be increased to  upon completion.

References

Dams in West Virginia
Tailings dams
Buildings and structures in Raleigh County, West Virginia
Mining in West Virginia
1995 establishments in West Virginia